Wang Feng (born 1956 in Guangxi) is a Chinese former footballer who played as a forward for the Chinese national football team during the 1970s and 80s.

Career statistics

International

International goals
Scores and results list China's goal tally first.

References

1956 births
Living people
Chinese footballers
China international footballers
Footballers from Guangxi
1980 AFC Asian Cup players
Association football forwards
Asian Games bronze medalists for China
Footballers at the 1978 Asian Games
Medalists at the 1978 Asian Games
Asian Games medalists in football